The Infiniti Q is a sedan manufactured by Nissan's Infiniti luxury brand, and can refer to:

Infiniti Q30 (2015–2019)
Infiniti Q45 (1989–2006)
Infiniti Q50 (2014–present)
Infiniti Q60 (2017–2022)
Infiniti Q70 (2013–2019)